Novoorsky District is an administrative and municipal district (raion), one of the thirty-five in Orenburg Oblast, Russia. Its administrative center is the rural locality (a settlement) of Novoorsk. Population: 29,428 (2010 Census);  The population of Novoorsk accounts for 38.4% of the district's total population.

References

Notes

Sources

Districts of Orenburg Oblast